El Fureidis (Arabic for "Little Paradise") is a  historic estate built in 1906 on  in Montecito, California. Originally called the James Waldron Gillespie Estate or Gillespie Palace after its original owner, the Spanish Baroque & Neo-Mudéjar architecture is one of only five houses designed by the American architect Bertram Grosvenor Goodhue.

The estate appeared in numerous hand-colored picture post cards from Santa Barbara during the 1900s–1950s highlighting Montecito's estates, the classical Persian gardens and Goodhue's unique architecture.

Movie location
El Fureidis is most famous for being the source of rare palm trees now found in Disneyland's Adventureland and Jungle Cruise ride. It was also used in the main outside location shots for Tony Montana's Coral Gables mansion in the 1983 film Scarface.

The El Fureidis estate was last on the market in 2006 for $37,500,000. It has been reported that Sergey Grishin the "Scarface Oligarch" is the current owner of the estate since 2019.

Official tour 

In 2014, an interactive tour of El Fureidis was built for potential buyers to tour the estate remotely.

A slide show, of images of the property, sketches, and interior can be found here.

References 
Notes

Houses in Santa Barbara County, California
Gardens in California
Montecito, California
Bertram Goodhue buildings
Mediterranean Revival architecture in California